Béatrice Bellamy (born 20 October 1966) is a French politician from Horizons (Ensemble). She has been member of the National Assembly for Vendée's 2nd constituency since 2022.

References

See also 

 List of deputies of the 16th National Assembly of France

Living people
1966 births
People from Nantes
21st-century French politicians
21st-century French women politicians
Women members of the National Assembly (France)
Deputies of the 16th National Assembly of the French Fifth Republic
Horizons politicians

Members of Parliament for Vendée